Yukari is a feminine Japanese given name.

Possible writings
Yukari can be written using many different combinations of kanji characters. Here are some examples:

由加里, "reason, addition, village"
由香里, "reason, smell, village"
由佳利, "reason, excellent, benefit"
由佳梨, "reason, excellent, pear tree"
由華莉, "reason, splendor/flower, jasmine"
夕香里, "evening, smell, village"
夕香莉, "evening, smell, jasmine"
夕花莉, "evening, flower, jasmine"
夕佳利, "evening, excellent, benefit"
裕佳里, "abundant, excellent, village"
裕佳梨, "abundant, excellent, pear tree"
優香理, "superiority, smell, logic"
友加里, "friend, addition, village"
結花理, "tie, flower, logic"
紫, "purple"
縁, "affinity/destiny"

The name can also be written in hiragana ゆかり or katakana ユカリ.

Notable people with the name
, Japanese actress, voice actress and gravure idol
Yukari Fresh, real name Yukari Takasaki (高崎 ゆかり), Shibuya-kei artist
, Japanese singer
, Japanese manga artist
, Japanese politician
, Japanese manga artist
, Japanese fencer
, Japanese archer
, Japanese women's footballer
Yukari Kokubun (國分 優香里, born 1983), Japanese voice actress
, Japanese model
, Japanese singer
, Japanese actress
, Japanese figure skater
, Japanese actress and voice actress
, Japanese ice hockey player
, Japanese actress and martial artist
, Japanese politician
, Japanese actress
, Japanese swimmer
, (born 1976), Japanese singer and voice actress
, Japanese speed skater
, Japanese field hockey player
, Japanese Go player

Fictional characters
, a character in the anime series Girls und Panzer
, a character in the manga series Paradise Kiss
, a character in the manga series Yuyushiki
, a character in the light novel series Shakugan no Shana
, a character in the manga series Vampire Princess Miyu
, a character in the manga series Locodol
, a character in the anime series Kirakira PreCure a la Mode
, a character from the game Liar Liar
, a character in the manga series Monthly Girls' Nozaki-kun
Yukari Morita, a character in the light novel series Rocket Girls
, a character in the novel Another
, a character in the manga series Shugo Chara!
, a character in the manga series Rosario + Vampire
, a character in the manga series Lucky Star
, a character in the video game Persona 3
, a character in the manga series Azumanga Daioh
, a character in the Touhou series
, a Vocaloid character
Yukari, a character in the Italian animated series Tommy & Oscar

See also
Yukari Telepath, a 2007 album by Coaltar of the Deepers

Japanese feminine given names